American Tourister is a brand of luggage owned by Samsonite. Brothers Sol and Irving Koffler founded American Luggage Works in Providence, Rhode Island, United States in 1933. In 1993, American Tourister was acquired by Astrum International, which also owns Samsonite. Astrum was renamed as the Samsonite Corporation two years later. Their products include backpacks, suitcases and wallets. Today, the American Tourister brand is sold as a more affordable brand in the Samsonite portfolio.

References

External links
https://shop.americantourister.com
https://www.luxurytourseg.com/en/
Luggage brands
Companies based in Rhode Island
Samsonite